The HeySong Beverage Museum is a museum in Zhongli District, Taoyuan City, Taiwan. The museum is owned by HeySong Corporation.

History
The museum was originally opened in 1996 as HeySong Museum. Over the years, the museum underwent renovations and expansions. In 2005, it was officially opened and was renamed to HeySong Beverage Museum.

Architecture
The front entrance of the museum displays light boxes about HeySong Soda and Sarsaparilla cans designed for the 2004 Changhua Straits Flower Exposition. The museum exhibits all HeySong advertisement, shop signage, logos, posters, etc.

See also
 List of museums in Taiwan

References

External links
 

1996 establishments in Taiwan
Food museums in Taiwan
Museums established in 1996
Museums in Taoyuan City